Starosubkhangulovo (İśke Sobxanğol) is a rural locality (a selo) and the administrative center of Burzyansky District in the Republic of Bashkortostan, Russia, located on the Belaya River. Population:

References

Notes

Sources

Rural localities in Burzyansky District